Carlos Jáuregui (22 September 195720 August 1996) was an Argentine LGBT rights activist. He founded  (CHA, or the Argentine Homosexual Community) in 1984. In the early 1990s, he set up  (Gays DC, or Gays for Civil Rights) and organised the first Pride march in Buenos Aires. He died from an HIV-AIDS-related illness at the age of 38. In memorial, a national day of activism for sexual diversity was established. He was posthumously given the Felipa de Souza Award, and, in 2017, a station was renamed after him on the Buenos Aires Underground.

Early life 
Carlos Jáuregui was born in La Plata on 22 September 1957. After attending university, he studied as a postgraduate in Paris and then lived in New York City. When he returned to Argentina in 1982, he was not yet an activist. The National Reorganization Process, the military dictatorship that had ruled Argentina since 1976, collapsed in 1983 and the following year Jáuregui founded  (CHA, or the Argentine Homosexual Community).

Career 

CHA became an important group campaigning for gay rights in Argentina and is internationally recognised as a force in creating the strong LGBT rights in Argentina. By the end of the 1990s it was giving legal assistance, remembering AIDS deaths and campaigning for HIV/AIDS awareness and against LGBT discrimination. Jáuregui published  (Homosexuality and Argentina) in 1987. It recounted his experiences as an activist in Argentina and the foundation of CHA.
Jáuregui then set up  (Gays DC, or Gays for Civil Rights) in 1991, which later became Gays and Lesbians for Civil Rights. Its most active years were 1993 until 1996, with the group focusing upon supporting victims of discrimination based on sexuality and sufferers of AIDS. Jáuregui became a media figure, performing stunts such as suing Antonio Quarracino (the Archbishop of Buenos Aires) for discrimination. Unlike other gay leaders at the time, he always insisted upon the four "legs" of the "table", namely gay, lesbian, transexual, and travesti, saying that if any leg was missing the whole table would collapse. The first march drew 300 people; by the late 2010s it was drawing over 100,000 people.

Death and legacy 
Carlos Jáuregui died at the age of 38 as a result of an HIV-AIDS-related illness on 20 August 1996. His partner Pablo Azcona and his brother Roberto Jáuregui had each previously died from AIDS related illnesses, in 1988 and 1994 respectively. Soon after his death, the Buenos Aires City Legislature voted to add a clause that punishes acts of sexual discrimination to the city's constitution.

A square was named after him in Buenos Aires, and an annual day of activism for sexual diversity was launched. In 1998, he was posthumously given the Felipa de Souza Award. A Buenos Aires Underground station was named after him in 2017; Santa Fe – Carlos Jáuregui station was opened by Horacio Rodríguez Larreta, chief of local government, and featured rainbow-coloured steps and a large mural. The Independent claimed it was the first station in the world to be named after an LGBT activist.

Mabel Bellucci wrote  (Pride – Carlos Jáuregui, a political biography), which was published in 2010. A film about Jáuregui's life was made in 2016, titled Carlos Jáuregui: The Unforgettable Fag.

References 

1957 births
1996 deaths
20th-century Argentine male writers
AIDS-related deaths in Argentina
Felipa de Souza Award
Argentine LGBT rights activists
Argentine LGBT writers
20th-century LGBT people